Filistatoides is a genus of crevice weavers that was first described by F. O. Pickard-Cambridge in 1899.

Species
 it contains four species:
Filistatoides insignis (O. Pickard-Cambridge, 1896) (type) – Guatemala
Filistatoides milloti (Zapfe, 1961) – Chile
Filistatoides polita (Franganillo, 1936) – Cuba
Filistatoides xichu Brescovit, Sánchez-Ruiz & Alayón, 2016 – Mexico

References

Araneomorphae genera
Filistatidae
Spiders of North America
Spiders of South America